The International Association for the Plant Protection Sciences (IAPPS) has the goal of gathering the results of plant protection research worldwide and making them globally available to science and practice. To this end the organisation periodically publishes the Plant Protection Magazine and every four years organises an international congress, the latest of which took place in Berlin (IPPC 2015)

History 
The IAPPS was founded in 1946 during the first International Plant Congress in Louvain, Belgium. The first president of the organisation was Olaf Freyberg of Malmö, Sweden, who made the following comment:
The world needs a plant protection organization, and not only to plan future congresses, but much more provide a platform for the discussion of current research results amongst scientists.

Over the years a newsletter has been periodically published, a yearbook has appeared, and congresses have been held. Every four years international congresses have been held in various parts of the globe. Plant protection scientists and agricultural research societies from all over the world are represented in the governing body. The IAPPS organisation now has 15 regional offices.
 
The International Plant Protection Congress in Berlin in 2015 meetings was organized by the German Phytomedical Society (Deutsche Phytomedizinische Gesellschaft), the Julius Kuehn Institute and the German Association of Industrialpartners for Agriculture.

Congress - Year Venue; President, Organisers 

1- 1946      Louvain,   Belgium;   Dr. A.  Strassens
2- 1949      London, England;   Viscount Bledisloe
3- 1952      Paris, France;   Dr. Jean Lefevre
4- 1957      Hamburg, Germany;   Prof.  H. Richter
5- 1963      London, England;   Sir Robert Robinson
6- 1967      Vienna, Austria;   Prof. F. Beran
7- 1970      Paris, France;   Dr.Jean Bustarret / Dr. M. Colas
8- 1975      Moscow, USSR;   Dr. Ivan Churayev / Dr. A. A. Goltsov
9- 1979      Washington, DC;   Dr. James D. Horsfall  Dr. Bill Tweedy/APS
10- 1983      Brighton, UK;   Dr. Leonard Broadbent    / Dr. E. Lester
11- 1987      Manila, Philippines;  Dr. Jose Velsaco/ Dr. Edwin Magallona
12- 1991      Rio de Janeiro, Brazil;   Mr. Omuz F. Rivaldo/ Christiano W. Simon
13- 1995      The Hague, Netherlands;   Dr. Johan Dekker/ Prof. Dr. Jan Zadoks
14- 1999      Jerusalem, Israel;   Dr. Yoram Rossler/ Dr. Jaacov Katan
15- 2004      Beijing, P.R. China;   Hans Herren/IAPPS/ Dr. Cheng  Zhuo-min/ CSPP L. Apple/IAPPS
16- 2007      Glasgow, Scotland;   Hans Herren/IAPPS/ Dr. David V. Alford/BCPC E.A.Heinrichs/IAPPS
17- 2011      Honolulu, Hawaii;   Geoff Norton / Ray Martyn/APS B. G.Tweedy/IAPPS  E. A. Heinrichs/IAPPS
18- 2015      Berlin, Germany;   Geoff Norton/ Falko Feldmann DPG Geoff Norton/IAPPS E.A. Heinrichs/IAPPS

External links 
 Webpage IAPPS
 IAPPS Activities

References 

Agricultural organizations based in the United States
Conservation and environmental foundations in the United States
Crop protection organizations
Non-profit organizations based in Nebraska
Plant conservation
Scientific organizations established in 1946